4-Cyano-3-(trifluoromethyl)aniline, also known as 4-amino-2-(trifluoromethyl)benzonitrile, is a cyanated and trifluoromethylated derivative of aniline. It is the starting material in one of the chemical syntheses of the nonsteroidal antiandrogen bicalutamide.

References

Amines
Anilines
Nitriles
Trifluoromethyl compounds